Leon Packheiser (born 16 May 1995) is a German footballer who plays as a midfielder for HFC Falke.

Career
Packheiser made his professional debut for Rot-Weiß Erfurt in the 3. Liga on 15 March 2014, coming on as a substitute in the 87th minute for Marius Strangl in the 4–2 win against VfB Stuttgart II.

References

External links
 Profile at DFB.de
 Profile at kicker.de

1995 births
Living people
German footballers
Association football midfielders
FC Rot-Weiß Erfurt players
3. Liga players
Regionalliga players
Lüneburger SK Hansa players